Taliyara is a village of Gandevi taluka,  Navsari district in south part of Gujarat State, India.

It is situated on the road connecting two villages dhamdacha and devdha, on the banks of the Ambika River. The population of Taliyara consists of Anavil, Koli and Halpati, Dhodiya
community Such a Nice Place.

The nearby towns are Gandevi and Bilimora.

Villages in Navsari district